Noorandu Kalam Vazhga is a 1970 Indian Tamil-language drama film starring  A. V. M. Rajan, Kanchana and Vennira Aadai Nirmala, with M. N. Nambiar playing the antagonist.

Cast 
 A. V. M. Rajan
 Kanchana
 Vennira Aadai Nirmala
 M. N. Nambiar
 Nagesh
 V. K. Ramasamy
 Sachu
 Kaka Radhakrishnan
 Sarala
 Girija

Soundtrack 
The soundtrack was composed by K. V. Mahadevan.

Reception 
The Indian Express wrote that the film had "the rather overdone theme of orphan children and brother-sister affection", but praised the songs, and the performances of Nagesh, Ramasamy and Kanchana.

References 

1970s Tamil-language films